Mikaela Johanna Emilia Ingberg (born 29 July 1974 in Vaasa) is a female javelin thrower from Finland. Her personal best throw is 64.03 metres, achieved in September 2000 in Berlin. She was nicknamed "Mikke" during her career.

Her achievements include bronze medals at the 1995 World Championships, 1998 and 2002 European Championships. She has been coached by Tapio Korjus.

Achievements

References

External links
 
 
 

1974 births
Living people
Sportspeople from Vaasa
Finnish female javelin throwers
Athletes (track and field) at the 1996 Summer Olympics
Athletes (track and field) at the 2000 Summer Olympics
Athletes (track and field) at the 2004 Summer Olympics
Athletes (track and field) at the 2008 Summer Olympics
Olympic athletes of Finland
Swedish-speaking Finns
World Athletics Championships medalists
European Athletics Championships medalists
Goodwill Games medalists in athletics
Competitors at the 2001 Goodwill Games
20th-century Finnish women
21st-century Finnish women